This article is a list of environmental disasters. In this context it is an annotated list of specific events caused by human activity that results in a negative effect on the environment.

Environmental disasters by category

Agricultural

 Mismanagement and shrinking of the Aral Sea
 Salinity in Australia
 Salinization of the Fertile Crescent
 The Dust Bowl in Canada and the United States (1934–1939)
 The Great sparrow campaign; sparrows were eliminated from Chinese farms, which caused locusts to swarm the farms and contributed to a famine which killed 38 million people.
 Africanized bees, known colloquially as "killer bees"
 "Dirty dairying" in New Zealand
 Salton Sea California, U.S.

Biodiversity
 2006 Zakouma elephant slaughter
 Chestnut blight
 Decline of vultures in India due to Diclofenac leading to increased incidence of rabies
 Deforestation of Easter Island
 Destruction of the old growth forests
 Devil facial tumour disease
 Dutch Elm Disease
 Emerald Ash Borer
 Environmental threats to the Great Barrier Reef
 Extinction of Australian megafauna
 Four Pests Campaign of China, 1958
 Ghost nets
 Grounding of SS Makambo on Lord Howe Island
 Invasive species in New Zealand
 Introduction of the Nile perch into Lake Victoria in Africa, devastating indigenous fish species
 Mercury contamination in Grassy Narrows
 Rabbits in Australia
 Red imported fire ants
 Reduction in the number of the American Bison
 
 Shark finning
 The Saemangeum Seawall
 The loss of biodiversity of New Zealand

Human health
 Introduction of the bubonic plague (the Plague of Justinian) in Europe from Africa in the 7th century resulting in the death of up to 60% (100 million) of the population.
 Introduction of the bubonic plague (the Black Death) in Europe from Central Asia in the 14th century resulting in the death of up to 60% (200 million) of the population and recurring until the 18th century.
 Introduction of infectious diseases by Europeans causing the death of indigenous people during European colonization of the Americas
 Health effects arising from the September 11 attacks
 Goiânia accident, human deaths resulting from dismantling a scrapped medical machine containing a source of radioactivity
 Agent Orange use by the United States during the Vietnam War, resulting in lasting serious health effects on the Vietnamese population, such as cancer, nervous system disorders, and countless related fatalities
 Mercury contamination in Grassy Narrows

Industrial

 1912 Itai-itai disease, due to cadmium poisoning in Japan
 1948 Donora smog
 1952 The Great Smog in London 
 1962 to 1970 Mercury contamination in Grassy Narrows 
 1970 Ontario Minamata disease in Canada
 1976 Seveso disaster, chemical plant explosion, caused highest known exposure to 2,3,7,8-tetrachlorodibenzo-p-dioxin (TCDD) in residential populations
 1983 Times Beach, Missouri the town was completely evacuated due to a dioxin contamination
 1984 Bhopal disaster (December 3, 1984, India), leak of methyl isocyanate resulted in more than 22,000 deaths.
 1986 Sandoz chemical spill into the Rhine river
 1989 Phillips Disasters
 1990, Release of cyanide, heavy metals and acid into the Alamosa River, Colorado, from the Summitville mine, causing the death of all aquatic life 17 miles downstream.
 1991, California's largest hazardous chemical spill: A 19,000-gallon (72,000 L) tank railroad car containing the pesticide/herbicide metam sodium derails from a northbound Southern Pacific freight train, tumbling off the bridge over the Sacramento River at the Cantara Loop near Dunsmuir, California, and rupturing on the rocks below, spilling the car's entire load into the river. Virtually every aquatic organism on a 40-mile (64 km) stretch of river was killed.
 2000 Baia Mare cyanide spill of a gold mine in Romania, January 2000
 2001 AZF Toulouse chemical factory explosion
 2003 Release of sulfur dioxide at the Al-Mishraq plant in Iraq
 2005 Jilin chemical plant explosions
  2007 Release of lead dust into Esperance Harbour
 2008 Guangxi chemical plant explosions China
 2008 Kingston Fossil Plant coal fly ash slurry spill
 2011 Bohai Bay oil spill China
 2012 Guangxi cadmium spill China, when toxic cadmium contaminated the Guangxi Longjiang river (龙江河) and water supply.
 2015 Shenzhen landslide China, a landslide of construction waste at Shenzhen.
 2018 Fujian Quangang Carbon Nine leakage event China
 Baogang Tailings Dam China
 Environmental issues with the Three Gorges Dam
 Health issues on the Aamjiwnaang First Nation due to chemical factories
 Love Canal toxic waste site
 Minamata disease (1950s and 1960s) mercury poisoning in Japan
 Release of CFCs resulting in ozone depletion
 Spring Valley, which was used as a chemical weapons testing ground during World War I.
 Sydney Tar Ponds and Coke Ovens sites in the city of Sydney, Nova Scotia, Canada, known as the largest toxic waste site in North America.
 United States Environmental Protection Agency Superfund sites in the United States

Mining

 Summitville mine in Colorado, from 1870 to 1992
 Iron Mountain Mine in California, from 1879 to 1963
 Argonaut Mine in California, from 1893 to 1942
 Copper mining in Tasmania, from 1893 to 1994
 Phosphate mining in Nauru, from 1906 to the 1990s
 Phosphate mining in St. Pierre Island from 1906 to 1972
 1947 Centralia mine disaster, a coal mine in Illinois
 Centralia mine fire, Pennsylvania, burning since 1962
 Mountaintop removal mining in the US since the 1960s
 Aberfan disaster, collapse of a coal mining waste pile in Wales, 1966
 Tui mine, tailings dam from the now abandoned in New Zealand, 1966 to 2013
 Darvaza gas crater in Derweze, Turkmenistan, burning since 1971
 Uranium mining controversy in Kakadu National Park in Australia, 1981 to 2009
 Ok Tedi environmental disaster in Papua New Guinea beginning in 1984
 Omai gold mine tailing dam breach in Guyana, 1995
 Marcopper mining disaster in the Philippines, March 1996
 Doñana disaster, tailings dam breach of the Los Frailes zinc/silver mine in Spain, April 1998
 Aitik mine, tailings dam failure in Sweden, September 2000
 Martin County sludge spill in Kentucky, October 2000
 Magellan Metals mine, lead dust in Australia, 2006
 Upper Big Branch Mine disaster in West Virginia, April 2010
 Padcal tailings spills of August-September 2012
 Talvivaara gypsum pond leak, Finland, 2012
 Obed Mountain coal mine spill in Alberta, Canada, October 2013
 2015 Gold King Mine waste water spill in Colorado, August 2015
 Mariana dam disaster, Samarco iron ore mine tailings dam failure, Minas Gerais and Espirito Santo to the Atlantic sea. Brazil, November 2015
 Orinoco Mining Arc, Venezuela, February 2016
 Brumadinho dam disaster of an iron ore mine in Brazil, January 2019
 Hpakant jade mine disaster landslide of tailings into waterway in Myanmar, July 2020

Oil industry

 Lakeview Gusher oil spill in California, 1910 –1911
 Leaded gasoline introduced 1920s; phased out globally by 2012.
 Greenpoint oil spill in Brooklyn, New York, 1940s–1980
 Mississippi River oil spill (1962–1963)
 Torrey Canyon oil spill off the SW coast of the United Kingdom, February 1967
 Lago Agrio oil field spills in Ecuador, since 1972 (possibly the worst of all)
 MV Sea Star and Horta Barbosa tankers collision and oil spill into the Gulf of Oman, December 1972
 Jakob Maersk oil spill off the coast of Portugal, January 1975
 Environmental issues in the Niger Delta relating to the oil industry, 1976–1996
 Arctic Refuge drilling controversy, since 1977
 Amoco Cadiz shipwreck and oil spill off the coast of Brittany, France, March 1978
 Ixtoc I oil spill into the Gulf of Mexico, June 1979
 SS Atlantic Empress collision and spill near Trinidad and Tobago, August 1979
 MT Independența collision and spill near Istanbul, November 1979
 Nowruz oil spills into the Persian Gulf, March 1983
 Castillo de Bellver oil spill off the coast of South Africa, August 1983
 Odyssey tanker shipwreck and oil spill, off the coast of Nova Scotia, November 1988
 Exxon Valdez oil spill in the Prince William Sound, Alaska, March 1989
 Gulf War oil spill into the Persian Gulf, January 1991
 MT Haven explosion and oil spill of the coast of Italy, April 1991
 ABT Summer explosion and oil spill off the coast of Angola, May 1991
 Mingbulak oil spill in Uzbekistan, March 1992
 MV Braer shipwreck and oil spill at the Shetland Islands, January 1993
 Taylor oil spill off the coast of Louisiana, since 2004
 Sidoarjo mud flow triggered by Lapindo Brantas gas exploration in 2006; East Java, Indonesia
 Deepwater Horizon oil spill in the Gulf of Mexico, April to July 2010
 2010 ExxonMobil oil spill in the Niger Delta in Nigeria, May 2010
 Jebel al-Zayt oil spill in the Red Sea, June 2010
 Xingang Port oil spill into the Yellow Sea, July 2010 
 Sanchi oil tanker collision in the East China Sea, January 2018
 Norilsk oil spill in Siberia in Russia in between May and June 2020.
 MV Wakashio oil spill in south Mauritius, since July 2020
 El Palito oil spill off the coast of Venezuela, since July 2020

Nuclear

 Chernobyl disaster in 1986 in Chernobyl, Ukraine killed 49 people and was estimated to have damaged almost $7 billion of property". Radioactive fallout from the accident concentrated near Belarus, Ukraine and Russia and at least 350,000 people were forcibly resettled away from these areas. After the accident, "traces of radioactive deposits unique to Chernobyl were found in nearly every country in the northern hemisphere".
 Fukushima Daiichi nuclear disaster: Following an earthquake, tsunami, and failure of cooling systems at Fukushima I Nuclear Power Plant and issues concerning other nuclear facilities in Japan on March 11, 2011, a nuclear emergency was declared. This was the first time a nuclear emergency had been declared in Japan, and 140,000 residents within 20 km of the plant were evacuated. Explosions and a fire have resulted in dangerous levels of radiation, sparking a stock market collapse and panic-buying in supermarkets.
 Mayak nuclear waste storage tank explosion, (Chelyabinsk, Soviet Union, September 29, 1957), 200+ people died and 270,000 people were exposed to dangerous radiation levels. Over thirty small communities had been removed from Soviet maps between 1958 and 1991.
 Windscale fire, United Kingdom, October 8, 1957. Fire ignites plutonium piles and contaminates surrounding dairy farms.
 Soviet submarine K-431 accident, August 10, 1985 (10 people died and 49 suffered radiation injuries).
 Soviet submarine K-19 accident, July 4, 1961 (8 deaths and more than 30 people were over-exposed to radiation).
 Nuclear testing at Moruroa and Fangataufa in the Pacific Ocean
 Fallout from the Castle Bravo nuclear test at Bikini Atoll in the Marshall Islands
 The health of Downwinders
 Atomic bombings of Hiroshima and Nagasaki Within the first two to four months of the bombings, the acute effects killed 90,000–166,000 people in Hiroshima and 60,000–80,000 in Nagasaki, with roughly half of the deaths in each city occurring on the first day.
 Three Mile Island, 1979 - It is the most significant accident in U.S. commercial nuclear power plant history. On the seven-point International Nuclear Event Scale, it is rated Level 5 – Accident with Wider Consequences.
 Hanford Nuclear, 1986 – The U.S. government declassifies 19,000 pages of documents indicating that between 1946 and 1986, the Hanford Site near Richland, Washington, released thousands of US gallons of radioactive liquids.  Radioactive waste was both released into the air and flowed into the Columbia River (which flows to the Pacific Ocean).   In 2014, the Hanford legacy continues with billions of dollars spent annually in a seemingly endless cleanup of leaking underground

Air/land/water
 Proliferation of plastic shopping bags
 Hong Kong Plastic Disaster

Air

 The Donora Smog of 1948 in Donora, Pennsylvania, in the United States
 The Great Smog of 1952, which killed 4,000 Londoners
 The 1983 Melbourne dust storm
 The 1997 Southeast Asian haze
 The 2005 Malaysian haze
 The 2006 Southeast Asian haze
 The Great Smog of Delhi in November 2016
 Yokkaichi asthma in Japan
 Health problems due to the Jinkanpo Atsugi Incinerator in Japan
 Kuwaiti oil fires
 Burning of the Amazon forest-2019

Land
 The Dust Bowl of Canada and the United States in the 1930s
 Contaminated soils in Mapua, New Zealand, due to the operation of an agricultural chemicals factory from 1932 to 1989
 Basin F, a disposal site in the United States created in 1956 for contaminated liquid wastes from the chemical manufacturing operations of the Army and its lessee Shell Chemicals company
 Nigeria gully erosion crisis, since before 1980
 Exide lead contamination at seven locations in the United States, since 1989
 Electronic waste in Guiyu, since the 1990s
 2006 Côte d'Ivoire toxic waste dump
 In Thathri Disaster 2023, the land and residential houses started cracking in Nayi Basti Thathri of Jammu and Kashmir, India.

Water
 Sandoz chemical spill, severely polluting the Rhine in 1986
 Selenium poisoning of wildlife due to farm runoff used to create Kesterson National Wildlife Refuge, and the artificial wetland
 The Jiyeh Power Station oil spill in the Mediterranean region
 Effects of polluted water in the Berkeley Pit in the United States
 Ignition and conflagration (13 times from 1868 to 1969) of the Cuyahoga River in Ohio, United States
 Cheakamus River derailment which polluted a river with caustic soda
 Draining and development of the Everglades
 Loss of Louisiana Wetlands due to Mississippi River levees, saltwater intrusion through manmade channels, timber harvesting, subsidence, and hurricane damage.
 Lake Okeechobee is heavily polluted and during extreme events releases large volumes of polluted water into the St. Lucie River estuary and the Caloosahatchee River estuary.
 Mercury contamination in Grassy Narrows pollution of Wabigoon River
 Amoco Cadiz oil spill off the coast of France in 1978
 Draining of the Mesopotamian Marshes in the 1990s
 Red Hill water crisis in Hawaiʻi, United States beginning in November 2021
 Oder environmental disaster in the 2022

Marine

 Coral bleaching
 Gulf of Mexico Dead Zone due to high-nutrient fertilizer runoff from the Midwest that is drained through the Mississippi River.
 The artificial Osborne Reef off the coast of Fort Lauderdale, Florida, in the United States
 Dumping of conventional and chemical munitions in Beaufort's Dyke, a sea trench between Northern Ireland and Scotland
 Marine debris
 Environmental threats to the Great Barrier Reef
Nurdles, plastic pellet typically under 5mm in diameter
 The Great Pacific Garbage Patch
 Minamata disease, mercury poisoning in Japan
 Mercury in fish
 Ocean acidification due to anthropogenic greenhouse gas emissions
 2022 Caspian seal die-off
 Industrial waste dumping in Central Vietnam from Formosa Ha Tinh Steel, which kills tons of marine creatures and destroys the ecosystem

See also
 Natural disaster
 List of environmental issues
 Timeline of environmental events
 Index of environmental articles
 Ecophagy, the consuming of an ecosystem
 List of Superfund sites in the United States

References

Environmental
Disasters